"Prisoner of Love" is a song by Tin Machine taken from their eponymous debut album. It was issued as their third single in October 1989.

Song development
Bowie claimed at the time he wrote the song for his then-partner Melissa Hurley. It reads as worldly advice from the singer to his naive younger girlfriend.

Live performances and video
The band elected not to make music videos for singles from the album, and instead created a 13-minute megamix video, in which "Prisoner of Love" was included. The video, directed by Julien Temple, went unreleased commercially until its 30th anniversary in 2019.

"Prisoner of Love" was performed during the 1989 Tin Machine Tour. The single was backed by live tracks recorded at La Cigale, Paris on 25 June 1989, and had a novel heart-shaped 7" picture disc release. It failed to chart in the UK or the US.

Track listing
7" version
"Prisoner of Love" (Edit) (Bowie, Gabrels, Sales, Sales) – 4:09
"Baby Can Dance" (Live) (Bowie) – 6:16

12"/CD version
"Prisoner of Love" (Edit) (Bowie, Gabrels, Sales, Sales) – 4:09
"Baby Can Dance" (Live) (Bowie) – 6:16
"Crack City" (Live) (Bowie) – 5:13
"Prisoner of Love" (LP version) (Bowie, Gabrels, Sales, Sales) – 4:15

Credits and personnel
Producers
 Tin Machine
 Tim Palmer

Musicians
 David Bowie – vocals, guitar
 Reeves Gabrels – lead guitar
 Hunt Sales – drums, vocals
 Tony Sales – bass, vocals

Additional musicians
 Kevin Armstrong – rhythm guitar

External links

References

Pegg, Nicholas, The Complete David Bowie, Reynolds & Hearn Ltd, 2000, 

1989 singles
Tin Machine songs
Songs written by David Bowie
1989 songs
EMI Records singles
Music videos directed by Julien Temple